On 15 February 2018, Cyril Ramaphosa was inaugurated as the President of the Republic of South Africa to serve out the remainder of Jacob Zuma's term in office following Zuma's resignation the previous day. On 26 February 2018, he announced his new cabinet. The President announced a cabinet reshuffle on 22 November 2018, following the death of Minister Edna Molewa and the resignation of Malusi Gigaba. There were a total of 33 ministerial portfolios in the cabinet.

Ministers

References

Government of South Africa
Executive branch of the government of South Africa
Cabinets of South Africa
2018 establishments in South Africa
Cabinets established in 2018
2019 disestablishments in South Africa
Cabinets disestablished in 2019